Justin M. Seaman is an American film director, producer, screenwriter, and editor. He is known for writing and directing the 2016 horror film The Barn and its upcoming sequel, The Barn Part II, and for directing segments of the anthology films Volumes of Blood: Horror Stories (2016) and 10/31 (2017). He is serving as a producer and director on the upcoming film Cryptids.

Career
Seaman wrote and directed the 2016 horror film The Barn. He directed the segment "The Deathday Party" from the 2016 anthology horror film Volumes of Blood: Horror Stories, as well as the segment "The Old Hag" from the 2017 anthology film 10/31. Seaman is writing and directing The Barn Part II, an upcoming sequel to The Barn, and is also serving as a producer and director on the upcoming film Cryptids.

References

External links
 

Film directors from Pennsylvania
Film producers from Pennsylvania
Screenwriters from Pennsylvania
People from Washington County, Pennsylvania
Year of birth missing (living people)
Living people